Lisa Carlton is a Republican politician from Florida. She served in the Florida Senate from 1998 to 2008, representing parts of Southwest Florida based around Sarasota. She served as the President Pro Tempore of the Florida Senate from 2006 to 2008. Carlton previously served two terms in the Florida House of Representatives, representing parts of Sarasota County from 1994 to 1998. Carlton currently serves as a guest lecturer at the Lou Frey Institute of Politics and Government at the University of Central Florida in Orlando, Florida.

She was appointed by Governor Rick Scott to serve on the 2017-2018 Florida Constitution Revisions Commission. Her great uncle is Doyle E. Carlton who served as Governor of Florida from 1929 to 1933.

Personal life

External links
Project Vote Smart - Senator Lisa Carlton (FL) profile
Follow the Money - Lisa Carlton
2006 2004 2002 1998 campaign contributions
Personal website
Commissioner Lisa Carlton - Florida Constitution Revision Commission

|-

|-

Republican Party Florida state senators
Republican Party members of the Florida House of Representatives
1964 births
Living people
Women state legislators in Florida
21st-century American women